Galantheae is a tribe of plants belonging to the subfamily Amaryllidoideae of the Amaryllis family (Amaryllidaceae). , it contains three genera, although more were included previously. The position of the ovary is inferior.

Taxonomy 
For a history of the circumscription of Galantheae, see Meerow et al. 2006. A narrower sense of the tribe is now favoured, with only three genera.

Phylogeny 
The placement of Galantheae within subfamily Amaryllidoideae is shown in the 
following cladogram:

Subdivision 

Included genera are:
Acis Salisb.
Galanthus L.
Leucojum L.

Previously included were:
Hannonia
Lapiedra
Vagaria

Distribution and habitat 
Galantheae represent one of the three European tribes of Amaryllidaceae (predominantly Mediterranean).

Cultivation 
Some species of Acis, Galanthus and Leucojum are common ornamental garden plants.

References

Bibliography

 
 
 Meerow A. 1995. Towards a phylogeny of the Amaryllidaceae. In P. J. Rudall, P. J. Cribb, D. F. Cutler, and C. J. Humphries [eds.], Monocotyledons: systematics and evolution, 169-179. Royal Botanic Gardens, Kew.
 Meerow A. and D. A. Snijman. 1998 Amaryllidaceae. In K. Kubitzki [ed.], Families and genera of vascular plants, vol. 3, 83-110. Springer-Verlag, Berlin.
 Müller-Doblies, D., and U. Müller-Doblies. 1978. Studies on tribal systematics of Amaryllidaceae. 1 The systematic position of Lapiedra Lag.. Lagascalia 8: 13-23.
 Meerow, Alan W. Michael F. Fay, Charles L Guy, Qin-BaoLi, Faridah Q Zaman and Mark W. Chase. 1999 Systematics of Amaryllidaceae based on cladistic analysis of plastid sequence data. American Journal of Botany. 86: 1325.
  Full text

External links 

Amaryllidoideae
Monocot tribes